The Church of the Immaculate Conception, Jinan, locally known as Jiangjunmiao Catholic Church, is the oldest Catholic church in Jinan, Shandong, China.

History 
The original church dates back to 1651, founded by Jaboulet, a Spanish missionary of the Franciscans. After the Chinese Rites controversy broke out, Yongzheng Emperor of the Qing dynasty (1644–1911) ordered to demolish churches, confiscate church lands and force Catholics to return to secular life. In 1861, French bishop Luigi Moccagatta came to Shandong and proposed to the Qing government to rebuild the Catholic church in Jiangjunmiao Street, which was approved. The reconstruction project started in 1864 with Romanesque architectural style by Italian bishop Eligio Pietro Cosi and was completed two years later. The church was named "Church of the Immaculate Conception" and used as the Cathedral of the Roman Catholic Archdiocese of Jinan. The abbey and episcopal office were added to the church in 1863 and the Haixing School was added to the church in 1898, respectively. In 1905, the Sacred Heart Cathedral replaced it as the cathedral of the Roman Catholic Archdiocese of Jinan. The church was closed in 1966 due to the Cultural Revolution. It was officially reopened to the public on 23 June 1979. In October 2013, it was designated as a provincial cultural relic preservation organ by the Shandong government.

References

Roman Catholic churches completed in 1866
Churches in Shandong
Tourist attractions in Jinan
1866 establishments in China
19th-century Roman Catholic church buildings in China